Krot is a Belarusian surname meaning mole (the mammal). It is a cognate of Kret (Polish), Krit (Ukrainian), and Krtek (Czech). Notable people with the surname include:

 Syarhey Krot (born 1980), Belarusian football player
 Yuriy Krot (born 1968), Belarusian football player and coach

See also
 

Belarusian-language surnames